Yere is both a given name and surname. Notable people with the name include:

Mama Bah-Yéré (born 1992), Beninese footballer
Menzie Yere (born 1983), Papua New Guinean rugby league footballer
Yere Goud (born 1971), Indian cricketer